Pressure is an effect which occurs when a force is applied on a surface.

Pressure may also refer to:

People
 Pressure (reggae musician) (born 1981), United States Virgin Islands reggae artist
 MC Pressure, MC with the Hilltop Hoods

Arts, entertainment, and media

Films
Pressure (1976 film), a Black-British film
Pressure (2002 film), a thriller film
Pressure (2015 film), an action film

Music
 The Pressure (band), an American band

Albums
 Pressure (Jeezy album), 2017
 Pressure (Maiko Zulu album), 2003
 Pressure (Open Space album), 2012
Pressure (Tyler Bryant & the Shakedown album), 2020
 Pressure (Wage War album), 2019

Songs
 "Pressure" (Ari Lennox song), 2021
 "Pressure" (Belly song), 2007
 "Pressure" (Billy Joel song), 1982
 "Pressure" (The Kinks song), 1979
 "Pressure" (Muse song), 2018
 "Pressure" (Nadia Ali song), 2011
 "Pressure" (Paramore song), 2005
 "Pressure" (Skindred song), 2006
 "Pressure" (Sunscreem song), 1991
 "Pressure" (Youngblood Hawke song), 2014
 "The Pressure" (song), by Jhene Aiko, 2014
 "The Pressure Part 1", by Sounds of Blackness, 1991
 "Pressure", by the 1975 from The 1975, 2013
 "Pressure", by Staind from Break the Cycle, 2001
 "Pressures", by Parkway Drive from Deep Blue, 2010
 "Under Pressure", by Queen and David Bowie, (1981)

Other uses in arts, entertainment, and media
Pressure (play), a 2014 play by David Haig
"Pressure", a SpongeBob SquarePants episode
”The Pressure,” an episode of The Amazing World of Gumball.

Science and technology
Peer pressure, a psychological influence exerted by a peer group
Pressure measurement, techniques that have been developed for the measurement of pressure and vacuum
Atmospheric pressure
Blood pressure
Sound pressure
Static pressure
Pressure vessel,  a container designed to hold gases or liquids at a pressure substantially different from the ambient pressure
Pressure cooker

Other uses
Pass pressure, defensive strategy in American football

See also

Press (disambiguation)
Pressure wave (disambiguation)
Under Pressure (disambiguation)